Peter Caruth (born 4 June 1988) is an Ireland men's field hockey international. He was a member of the Ireland team that won the bronze medal at the 2015 Men's EuroHockey Nations Championship.  He also represented Ireland at the 2016 Summer Olympics. At club level he has won Men's Irish Hockey League titles and the EuroHockey Club Trophy with Monkstown and the Kirk Cup with Annadale.

Early years, family and education
Caruth is from Belfast, Northern Ireland. He was educated at Gilnahirk Primary School,  Cabin Hill School and Campbell College.

In 2022, Caruth came out as gay, becoming the first Irish men's international hockey player to do so.

Domestic teams

Early years
As a youth Caruth played field hockey for both Campbell College and Annadale. The 2012–13 season saw him play for Braxgata in the Men's Belgian Hockey League.

Monkstown
In 2013 Caruth began playing for Monkstown in the Men's Irish Hockey League. He subsequently helped Monkstown win the league title in both 2013–14 and 2014–15. In the  2013–14 league final he scored twice as Monkstown defeated Banbridge 2–1. Together with Graham Shaw and Kyle Good, Caruth was also a member of the Monkstown team that won the 2014 EuroHockey Club Trophy. He again scored in the final as Monkstown defeated HC OKS-SHVSM of Ukraine 2–0. Caruth also played for Monkstown in the 2014–15 and the 2015–16 Euro Hockey Leagues.

Annadale
In 2016 Caruth re-joined Annadale, this time as a player/coach. In 2016–17 he guided Annadale to promotion form the Ulster Senior League to the Men's Irish Hockey League. He also scored a hat-trick as Annadale defeated Cookstown 8–1 in the Kirk Cup final. In 2018 Caruth and Anndale again played in the Kirk Cup final but this time, they lost to Banbridge.

Ireland international
Caruth made his senior debut for Ireland in October 2008 in a 2–2 draw with Argentina. He had previously played for Ireland A. He made his  major tournament debut at the 2009 Men's Hockey World Cup Qualifiers. Caruth was a member of the Ireland team that won the 2011 Men's Hockey Champions Challenge II. He also helped Ireland win Men's FIH Hockey World League tournaments in 2012 and 2015. At the 2014–15 Men's FIH Hockey World League Semifinals, Caruth made his 100th senior appearance for Ireland. Caruth was also a member of the Ireland team that won the bronze medal at the 2015 Men's EuroHockey Nations Championship. He also represented Ireland at the 2016 Summer Olympics.

Coach
In addition to his role as a player/coach with Annadale, Caruth has also coached at Muckross Hockey Club and Campbell College.

Honours
Ireland
Men's FIH Hockey World League Round 2
Winners: 2015 San Diego
Men's FIH Hockey World League Round 1
Winners: 2012 Cardiff
Men's Hockey Champions Challenge II
Winners: 2011
Men's Field Hockey Olympic Qualifier
Runners up: 2012
Annadale
Kirk Cup
Winners: 2016
Runners up: 2018
Monkstown
EuroHockey Club Trophy
Winners: 2014
Men's Irish Hockey League
Winners: 2013–14, 2014–15
Irish Senior Cup
Winners: 2015–16

References

1988 births
Living people
Ireland international men's field hockey players
Male field hockey players from Northern Ireland
Irish male field hockey players
British male field hockey players
Olympic field hockey players of Ireland
Field hockey players at the 2016 Summer Olympics
Men's Irish Hockey League players
Monkstown Hockey Club players
Male field hockey midfielders
Male field hockey forwards
Irish field hockey coaches
Expatriate field hockey players
Irish expatriate sportspeople in Belgium
Sportspeople from Belfast
People educated at Campbell College
Men's Belgian Hockey League players
Irish LGBT sportspeople